Itapua may refer to several places:

 Itapúa Department, Paraguay
 Itapuã, Salvador, Bahia, Brazil
 Itapuã State Park, Rio Grande do Sul, Brazil

See also